is a Japanese former baseball pitcher. He played in Major League Baseball from -, and -. He is currently the manager for the Hokkaido Nippon-Ham Fighters farm team in Nippon Professional Baseball's Eastern League.

Biography
In , he won 12 games, recorded the most strikeouts in his league, and was chosen for the All-Star game. Kida made 16 saves that year.

In 1999, he signed with the Detroit Tigers as a free agent, but was demoted to the minors, and he returned to the BlueWave in June, 2000. He joined the Los Angeles Dodgers in 2003, but got into a car accident in March, and was hospitalized (his translator, who was also in the car with him, also suffered serious injuries). He was promoted to the majors in August of the same year, but pitched in only 3 games. In September, he joined the Seattle Mariners, but only made one appearance in 2005, and was released after the season.

Tokyo Yakult Swallows player-manager Atsuya Furuta invited Kida to play in Japan, and he joined the team in the 2005 off-season. In , he posted a 3.09 ERA in 56 games as a reliever, and played in his second All-Star game, 16 years after his first appearance.

After pitching for the Swallows through the 2009 season, he joined the Hokkaido Nippon-Ham Fighters for 2010–2012.

Kida closed out his career in Japan's Baseball Challenge League, pitching for the Ishikawa Million Stars from 2013 to 2014. The Million Stars held a retirement ceremony for Kida on September 14, 2014. He struck out the side, and his uniform number 12 was retired by the team.

Pitching statistics
Nippon Professional Baseball (as of 2012)
 516 Games
 73 Wins
 50 Saves
 1,036 Strikeouts
 3.91 ERA

References

External links

1968 births
Baseball people from Tokyo Metropolis
Detroit Tigers players
Gulf Coast Dodgers players
Hokkaido Nippon-Ham Fighters players
Ishikawa Million Stars players
Japanese baseball coaches
Japanese expatriate baseball players in the United States
Las Vegas 51s players
Living people
Los Angeles Dodgers players
Nippon Professional Baseball coaches
Nippon Professional Baseball pitchers
Major League Baseball pitchers
Major League Baseball players from Japan
Miami Marlins (FSL) players
Orix BlueWave players
People from Kokubunji, Tokyo
Seattle Mariners players
Tacoma Rainiers players
Tokyo Yakult Swallows players
Toledo Mud Hens players
Yomiuri Giants players